The Daytime Emmy Award for Outstanding Informative Talk Show Host was an award presented annually by the National Academy of Television Arts and Sciences (NATAS) and Academy of Television Arts & Sciences (ATAS). The award was given in honor of a talk show host that was in the informative nature. It was awarded from the 42nd Daytime Emmy Awards ceremony, held in 2015, to the 49th Daytime Emmy Awards ceremony, held in 2022. During this period, the generic Outstanding Talk Show Host category was split into two specific categories: this award and Outstanding Entertainment Talk Show Host. In 2023, the NATAS will merge the two specific categories back into one.

Winners and nominees

2010s

2020s

Multiple wins
2 wins
Steve Harvey
Tamron Hall

Multiple nominations
5 nominations
Steve Harvey
Mehmet Oz

3 nominations
Mario Batali
Carla Hall
Tamron Hall
Clinton Kelly 
Larry King
Daphne Oz 
Michael Symon

References

External links
 Daytime Emmy Awards at the Internet Movie Database

Talk Show Host Informative
Awards established in 2015
2015 establishments in California
Awards disestablished in 2022